Thomas Irwin (1 July 1873 – 22 February 1956) was an Irish Gaelic footballer, hurler, referee and Gaelic games administrator who played in various positions for both Cork senior teams.

One of the earliest dual players at the highest levels, he first played in 1892 and was a regular member of both teams until his retirement in 1902. He won one All-Ireland hurling medal, three Munster hurling medals and three Munster football medals.

At club level Irwin was a multiple county club championship medalist with Redmond's and Nils.

In retirement from playing Irwin served as a dual inter-county referee at the highest levels while also serving as a Gaelic games administrator with the Cork County Board.

References

 
 

 
 

 
 

 
 

1873 births
1956 deaths
All-Ireland Senior Football Championship Final referees
All-Ireland Senior Hurling Championship winners
Dual players
Cork inter-county Gaelic footballers
Cork inter-county hurlers
Gaelic football referees
Hurling referees
Nils Gaelic footballers
Redmond's hurlers